Okram Roshini Devi (born 8 February 1994 in Manipur) is an Indian women footballer who currently plays as a goalkeeper for the India women's national football team.

Playing career
Devi represented India at the 2010, and 2014 SAFF Women's Championship tournaments.

Honours

India
 SAFF Women's Championship: 2010, 2014
 South Asian Games Gold medal: 2016

Manipur
 Senior Women's National Football Championship: 2019–20, 2021–22

References

External links 
 Eurosport player profile

1994 births
21st-century Indian women
21st-century Indian people
Asian Games competitors for India
Footballers at the 2014 Asian Games
Footballers from Manipur
India women's international footballers
Indian women's footballers
Living people
Sportswomen from Manipur
Women's association football goalkeepers
South Asian Games gold medalists for India
South Asian Games medalists in football